Carlo Cercignani (17 June 1939 in Teulada – 7 January 2010 in Milan) was an Italian mathematician known for his work on the kinetic theory of gases. His contributions to the study of Boltzmann's equation include the proof of the H-theorem for polyatomic gases.  The Cercignani conjecture is named after him.

Cercignani's conjecture is "sometimes true and always almost true", as proved by the Fields medalist mathematician Cedric Villani.

He is the author of several monographs and more than 300 papers in kinetic theory, as well as of a biography of Boltzmann. Cercignani was member of the French Academy of Sciences and of the Accademia dei Lincei. He received the Humboldt Prize in 1994.

Selected publications

Kinetic theory

History of science

Notes

External links

Mathematical physicists
Members of the French Academy of Sciences
2010 deaths
1939 births